The North American Mission Board (NAMB) is the domestic missions agency of the Southern Baptist Convention (SBC). It is involved in Southern Baptist church planting and revitalization, coordinating one of the United States's largest disaster relief agencies through the cooperation of state Baptist relief agencies, creating evangelism resources and other programs such as chaplaincy support and pastoral training. NAMB is currently headquartered in Alpharetta, Georgia.

The President of NAMB is Kevin Ezell. Vance Pitman oversees church planting as president of Send Network, and Bryant Wright oversees disaster relief as President of Send Relief.

History
The organization was founded in 1874 as the Home Mission Board. 

In 1997, the Home Mission Board merged with the Brotherhood Commission and Radio and Television Commission to form the North American Mission Board. 

The SBC ceased supporting the cable American Christian Television System in 2003. NAMB ceased radio production in 2005. In 2007, NAMB sold FamilyNet to In Touch Ministries.

In 2021, it reported an operating budget of 99,000,000. It is funded through a combination of the Southern Baptist Cooperative Program and the Annie Armstrong Offering.

Leadership
The first NAMB president in 1997 was Robert Reccord. Citing “honest philosophical and methodological differences,” Bob Reccord resigned as NAMB president in April 2006.

The following president of NAMB was Geoff Hammond, who was elected by a unanimous vote in March 2007. Hammond resigned in August 2009 after an all-day closed session meeting with over 50 trustees.

In September 2010, Kevin Ezell was elected president. Ezell was formerly pastor of Highview Baptist Church in Louisville, KY.

Vance Pitman joined NAMB as a national mobilizer in September 2015. He was then chosen as the new president of Send Network in December 2021, replacing Dhati Lewis who led Send Network for three years. Send Network debuted a new leadership team, new values, and a Spanish website in the fall of 2022.

Bryant Wright was selected as president of Send Relief by NAMB and IMB in March 2020.

See also
 American Southern Baptist Mission
 List of American Southern Baptist missionaries in China
 International Mission Board

References

External links 

Southern Baptist Convention
Christian organizations established in 1997
Baptist missionary societies
Baptist organizations established in the 20th century
Evangelism